The Synod of Victoria and Tasmania is the entity of the Uniting Church in Australia covering the states of Victoria and Tasmania. It is one of six geographically-based synods of the church. When the Uniting Church was created in 1977, the Synod of Victoria and Synod of Tasmania were independent, but subsequently merged on 22 June 2002.

The leader of the synod is the moderator elected to the position for a period of three years. Rev Denise Liersch became Moderator of the Synod of Victoria and Tasmania on 5 July 2019. She replaced Reverend Sharon Hollis who was announced as the president-elect of the Uniting Church, to become president in 2021, on 12 July 2018.

Presbyteries
The Synod of Victoria and Tasmania now comprises eight presbyteries (regional councils):
Presbytery of Gippsland
Presbytery of Loddon Mallee
Presbytery of North East Victoria
Presbytery of Port Phillip East
Presbytery of Port Phillip West
Presbytery of Tasmania
Presbytery of Western Victoria
Presbytery of Yarra Yarra

When the Uniting Church in Australia was created in 1977, there were 17 presbyteries: three in the Synod of Tasmania and fourteen in the Synod of Victoria.

Moderators

Victoria and Tasmania

Victoria

Tasmania

References

External links 
 

Uniting Church in Australia
Protestantism in Victoria (Australia)
Religion in Tasmania